Lustenberger is a surname, and may refer to:
Karl Lustenberger (born 1952), a Swiss Nordic combined skier
Christina Lustenberger (born 1984, British Columbia), a Canadian alpine skier
Samuel Lustenberger (born 1985), a Swiss-born Dominican Republic footballer
Claudio Lustenberger (born 1987), a Swiss football defender
Fabian Lustenberger (born 1988, Nebikon), a Swiss footballer

Swiss-German surnames
German-language surnames